Blue Murder: Killer Cop is a two-part Australian television miniseries based on true events, produced by the Seven Network and premiered on 6 August 2017. It is a sequel to the miniseries Blue Murder which screened in 1995 on the ABC. Set in the 1990s,  2000s and 2010s in Sydney, the miniseries continues the story of the life of former Detective Roger "the Dodger" Rogerson.  The series is directed by Michael Jenkins and produced by John Edwards for Endemol Shine.

Synopsis
The series follows Roger Rogerson, post Blue Murder (1995), showing how he met his wife Anne and the murder of Jamie Gao that led to his arrest and murder conviction.

Cast 
 Richard Roxburgh as Roger Rogerson
 Dan Wyllie as Michael Hurley
 Toni Collette as Anne Melocco
 Matt Nable as Detective Mark Standen
 Emma Booth as Detective Julie Wienthall
 Aaron Pedersen as Detective Joe Kenshell
 Toby Schmitz as Internal Affairs Detective Jed Wilson
 Justin Smith as Glen McNamara
 Steve Le Marquand as Detective Larry Churchill
 Lee Shaw as Les Mara
 Peter Phelps as Graham 'Abo' Henry
 Andrew Ryan as Wayne Crofton
 Damian Walshe-Howling as Alan Abrahams
 Robert Mammone as James Kinch
 Aaron Jeffery as Chris Bronowski
 Michael Denkha as Bill Jalalaty
 Tony Martin as Arthur "Neddy" Smith
 Michael Tran as Jamie Gao
 Mark Ferguson (stock footage)
Jack Kelly as Robert 'Dolly' Dunn

Reception

Viewership

The first part of the mini-series achieved a metro ratings audience of 717,000, coming second in its timeslot behind 60 Minutes and ranking seventh of the night.

The second part of the mini-series dropped  200,000 viewers and achieved a metro ratings audience of 516,000, coming third in its timeslot behind This Time Next Year & Have You Been Paying Attention? respectively and ranking 20th of the night.

Reviews

The series has received positive reviews, Denise Eriksen, journalist for The New Daily said "This is a brilliantly written, layered drama, it weaves together many stories of flawed-yet-interesting men into a seamless narrative and features some of Australia’s best actors."

Bridget McManus, writer for The Sydney Morning Herald gave the series 4 out of 5 stars, praising Richard Roxburgh and Toni Collette for their roles in the series saying "Richard Roxburgh slips so effortlessly back into the role, whilst Toni Collette is superb as she nails the strident Sydney accent and strangely sensual frump of the printing shop worker whose heart Rogerson stole".

David Knox, writer for TV Tonight also gave the series 4 out of 5 stars saying "The sequel stands up well, thanks to retaining its links with director Michael Jenkins and Roxburgh. It does adhere to the true crime bio-pic path than look more broadly at an era in NSW law & order, with its leading man promoted to anti-hero".

Accolades

References

2010s Australian drama television series
2010s Australian television miniseries
2010s Australian crime television series
Seven Network original programming
Period television series
Television shows set in Sydney
2017 Australian television series debuts
2017 Australian television series endings